This is the electoral history of Michael Bloomberg, billionaire and the 108th Mayor of New York City from 2002 to 2013. He was a late entry to the 2020 Democratic Party presidential primaries, competing only in Super Tuesday and ending his campaign the morning after.

New York City mayoral elections

2001

2005

2009

2020 Democratic party presidential primaries

Notes

References

Michael Bloomberg
Bloomberg, Michael
Bloomberg, Michael